Gilles Petrucci (born 4 December 1968) is a retired French football defender.

References

1968 births
Living people
French footballers
FC Martigues players
FC Istres players
Association football defenders
Ligue 1 players
Ligue 2 players